The Circumferential Road 5–Kalayaan Avenue Interchange, also known as the C-5–Kalayaan Interchange, is a road interchange in Makati, Metro Manila, the Philippines. Originally a regular four-way intersection between Carlos P. Garcia Avenue, a part of Circumferential Road 5 (C-5), and Kalayaan Avenue, it was fitted in 2009 with the country's first elevated U-turn slots, built in an attempt to speed up traffic along the C-5 corridor.

History

The C-5–Kalayaan intersection is the first major intersection of C-5 south of the Pasig River, and traffic congestion in the area is very heavy, even extending to as far north as Ortigas Avenue during rush hour. This ultimately led both the Metropolitan Manila Development Authority (MMDA) and the Department of Public Works and Highways (DPWH) to conclude that the construction of an interchange between the two roads was needed to speed up traffic. However, both agencies disagreed on the final design of the interchange.

In the end, the DPWH's proposal, which would have cost , was abandoned in favor of the MMDA's proposal, which was half the cost.  Construction of the interchange, funded by a Japanese loan package, began in April 2008, when work began on the southern elevated U-turn slot, which was completed six months later.  The northern elevated U-turn slot, meanwhile, began construction on December 2, 2008, and was completed on April 17, 2009.  During construction, traffic that would normally cross the C-5–Kalayaan intersection was diverted through Circumferential Road 3 (C-3), including Gregorio Araneta Avenue, and Epifanio de los Santos Avenue (EDSA).

The entire interchange was inaugurated by President Gloria Macapagal Arroyo, accompanied by MMDA Chairman Bayani Fernando, on May 5, 2009, and it was opened to traffic the next day.

Impact
The impact of the C-5–Kalayaan Interchange's construction was initially positive. Within a week of the interchange's opening, the MMDA claimed that both traffic speed and vehicular volume increased, with more than 150,000 cars now passing through the intersection daily, taking an estimated amount of 30,000 vehicles off of EDSA in the process.

Criticism
Criticism on the construction of the C-5–Kalayaan Interchange has been varied, and public reaction has been mixed.  It has been argued that the construction of the interchange led to significant public inconvenience, and criticism of the design has varied from being aesthetically unpleasing to, in the words of Lester Dizon of The Philippine Star, being a "public nuisance".  Another Star columnist, James Deakin, argued that the location of the elevated U-turn slots was ill-conceived, even calling the interchange one of Metro Manila's worst eyesores.  Journalist Korina Sanchez, meanwhile, claimed that the interchange was a PR stunt for Bayani Fernando, who she claims was not used to going unnoticed.

Senator Francis Escudero meanwhile insinuated that the MMDA focuses too much energy on traffic mitigation instead of flood control, criticizing the opening of the interchange while Metro Manila was affected by flooding caused by Typhoon Emong (Chan-hom) just a few days earlier.

Structurally, the elevated U-turn slots have been criticized for failing global traffic standards, even earning protest from a local association of structural engineers who questioned the interchange's safety.

The C-5–Kalayaan Interchange abuts three constituent Metro Manila local government units, and while the mayors of Pateros and Taguig were supportive of the interchange's construction, claiming that it allows them to better manage traffic in their respective localities; Makati Mayor Jejomar Binay opposed.

References

Road interchanges in the Philippines
Japan International Cooperation Agency